Macrosoma intermedia is moth-like butterfly described by Paul Dognin in 1911. It belongs to the Hedylidae family. Originally, it was in the genus Phellinodes.

Distribution
The species is recorded from Costa Rica, San Antonio, Colombia, Rio Ucayali in eastern Peru.

Description

Wings
Adult male has greyish brown ground colour wings. Weakly excavated apex of the forewing is of pale brown color and is bordered by brownish black color. Distal is 1/3 darker than rest of the wing. The hindwing is semi-translucent medially, with broad dark border. Forewing length is 18–20 mm.

Genitalia
In males, the saccus is short, the gnathos broadly fused with the central component and weakly denticulated laterally and the valva subtriangular.

Antenna
The antennae of adult males are not bipectinate.

Diagnosis
M. intermedia is distinguished from M. cascaria by the presence of semitranslucent areas on the wings and the absence of the white triangular mark on the costa of the forewing. This species is distinguished from M. paularia by the less extensive semitranslucent area on the hindwing. The valva of M. intermedia is narrower at the base than in M. cascaria.

References
 Macrosoma intermedia - Overview - Encyclopedia of Life.
 Catalogue of Life.
 A catalogue of the Hedylidae (Lepidoptera: Hedyloidea), with descriptions of two new species.
  An identification guide to the Hedylidae (Lepidoptera: Hedyloidea).

Sources

Hedylidae
Butterflies described in 1911
Hedylidae of South America